Southampton is an unincorporated community in the City of Richmond, in the U.S. state of Virginia.

References

Unincorporated communities in Virginia
Unincorporated communities in Richmond County, Virginia